The 1992 All Japan Sports Prototype Car Endurance Championship was the tenth and final season of the All Japan Sports Prototype Championship, which would be replaced by the All Japan Grand Touring Car Championship, as sportscar racing in the early 1990s changed drastically with the decline of prototypes. The C1 class champion was the #1 Nissan Motorsports Nissan R92CP driven by Kazuyoshi Hoshino and the C class champion was the #7 and #36 TOM'S Toyota TS010 driven by Geoff Lees.

Schedule
All races were held in Japan.

Entry list

 – At Round 5 at Fuji Speedway, the C1 and C classes were renamed LD2 and LD1 respectively as the race was part of the Fuji Long Distance Series.

Season results
Overall winner in bold. Season results as follows:

Point Ranking

C1 Class (Top 5)

Drivers

C Class (Top 5)

Drivers

References

External links
 1992-C 全日本スポーツプロトタイプカー耐久選手権 

JSPC seasons
All Japan Sports Prototype